Ursula Strauss (born 25 April 1974) is an Austrian actress. She is best known for her role as Inspector Angelika Schnell in the television series Schnell ermittelt. Strauss was born in Melk.

Selected filmography

References

External links

 
 www.ursulastrauss.at – Official website
  - Agency website

1974 births
Living people
Austrian film actresses
Austrian television actresses
People from Melk